Tarakasi is a type of silver filigree work from Cuttack, a city in Odisha in the eastern part of India.

Origin

This highly skilled art form is more than 500 years old and is traditionally done by local artisans on the Eastern shores of Odisha. Presently, the silver filigree workers are largely from the district of Cuttack, where the art flourishes.

Technique
The filigree artists work with an alloy of 90% or more pure silver. First, the lump of silver is placed into a small clay pot and the two are put into a bucket full of hot coals. The temperature is regulated through a bellows that is hand operated by a crank.

The melting process takes about ten minutes and then the silver is poured into a small, rod-like mold and cooled by submerging the rod in water. It is then placed into a machine that will press the rod into a long, thin wire. This tedious and physically demanding process had been done traditionally by hand and took two men to turn the crank.

Once the silver is pressed into a flat, workable wire, the wire itself can first be hand carved with intricate designs or immediately smoldered by a small kerosene fire with one artist directing the small flame with a tube held in his mouth into which he can blow. This process makes it easier for the artisan to mold the wire into the desired frame for the piece before it is cooled. Next the wires are strung together and twisted and shaped into a design by the artist’s precise fingers. Soldering is done by placing the piece into a mixture of borax powder and water, sprinkling soldering powder on it, and then placing it once again under the small flame. This insures that the detail of the design will stay intact.

Once this is done, the artist will take the warm piece and shape it into an ornament. Techniques such as granulation, snow glazing and casting are used innovatively to heighten the effect. Artisan Jagdish Mishra, speaking of the techniques employed says, "The tastes of the customers keep changing and artists must be up to date with to keep up with emerging trends". Such new methods and experimentation are increasingly being employed to produce highly polished and refined artifacts in keeping with the demands of customers. Platinum polishing is done to give a more lasting shine whereas fusion of silver and brass or other materials is done to create interesting effects.

Tradition
Forms of animals, birds, flowers and even miniature handbags and other souvenirs are made in Tarakasi work. The Konark Chakra and temple are great favorites as mementos. Scenes from the Mahabharata, in particular the still from the Bhagavad Gita depicting the chariot of Arjuna driven by Lord Krishna are quite popular. Over the years various famous monuments like the TajMahal, Eiffel Tower etc. has been made, garnering accolades from admirers of fine arts.

The filigree jewelry is particularly rich in patterns. In Odisha, the stress is on arm jewelry, necklaces, toe rings and especially anklets, which are a great favorite. They are considered auspicious as well. Intricate anklets, combining use of semi-precious stones are greatly preferred.

Vermillion boxes, brooches, pendants, earrings and hairpins are in great demand. Vermillion box is must in any Oriya marriage, but this tradition dying out. Waist band made from Tarakasi work were used traditionally in the marriage. Oriya marriages are incomplete without Tarakasi anklets and toe rings.

Odissi
The jewelry worn in Odissi, one of the classical dances of India originating from Odisha, are made from Tarakasi work. These ornaments adorn the head, ear, neck, hands, fingers and waist of the dancer. The ornaments include a choker, ‘padaka-tilaka’ (a long necklace), ‘bahichudi’ or ‘tayila’ (armlets), ‘kankana’ (bracelets), a 'mekhalaa' (belt), anklets, bells, ’kapa’ (earrings) and a ‘seenthi’ (ornament work on the hair and forehead). These ornaments are embellished with natural un-cut stones lined with silver and gold.

Durga puja

The introduction of the Sharadiya Utsav tradition in the city dates back to the visit of Saint Chaitanya in the 16th century when the consecration of the idol of Durga by using the mask pattern was conducted in his presence at Binod Behari Devi Mandap.

Every year, during Durga Puja in [Cuttack], Tarakasi jewelry is used at many pandals to embellish the idols of Durga. One of the most famous idols is the one at Chandni Chowk, where the entire crown and accessories of Durga are made of silver, popularly known as Chaandi Medha. Other pandals using Tarakasi are Chauliaganj, Choudhury Bazar, Khan Nagar, Banka Bazar, Balu Bazar etc.

Every year more than 150 filigree artisans are engaged in making backdrop and ornament design. The style was introduced at the Choudhury Bazaar puja pandal with a 250 kg chandi medha in 1956. Following suit, Sheikh Bazaar puja mandap installed a 350 kg chandi medha in 1991. In 2004, Ranihat puja committee joined the elite group with a 483 kg of silver filigree backdrop, jewelry and weaponry. In the following year, Haripur-Dolamundai puja committee superseded Ranihat when it installed 500 kg silver filigree. In 2006, the Sheikh Bazaar committee remodeled a new backdrop using 450 kg of silver. Chandini Chowk, Sheikh Bazaar, Alisha Bazaar, Chauliaganj, Badambadi, Ranihat, Haripur-Dolamundai and Balu Bazaar-Binod Behari puja committees are vouching for the filigree work. There is a competition to notch the best show every year among all puja committees in Cuttack.

References

External links
 Technique of Tarakasi

Cuttack
Indian metalwork
Silversmithing
Jewellery making
Odia culture
Jewellery of India